Héctor Cención (born 2 April 1999) is a Panamanian karateka. At the 2019 Pan American Games held in Lima, Peru, he won one of the bronze medals in the men's kata event.

In 2018, he won the silver medal in the men's kata event at the 2018 South American Games held in Cochabamba, Bolivia. In 2018, he also competed in the men's individual kata event at the 2018 World Karate Championships held in Madrid, Spain.

Héctor Cencion is three-time national champion and a six-time adult Central American champion. He is a five-time South American finalist, being 2 times South American champion and 3 times vice champion. He is a two-time U21 Pan American Champion and in 2019 he was No. 1 in the world ranking for under-21 karateka. 

In 2019 he won the title of the best athlete of the year in PANAMA, the winner among all sports.

In June 2021, he competed at the World Olympic Qualification Tournament held in Paris, France hoping to qualify for the 2020 Summer Olympics in Tokyo, Japan. In November 2021, he competed at the 2021 World Karate Championships held in Dubai, United Arab Emirates.

He won one of the bronze medals in the men's kata event at the 2022 Bolivarian Games held in Valledupar, Colombia. He competed in the men's kata at the 2022 World Games held in Birmingham, United States. He won one of the bronze medals in his event at the 2022 South American Games held in Asunción, Paraguay.

References 

Living people
1999 births
Place of birth missing (living people)
Panamanian male karateka
Pan American Games medalists in karate
Pan American Games bronze medalists for Panama
Medalists at the 2019 Pan American Games
Karateka at the 2019 Pan American Games
South American Games medalists in karate
South American Games silver medalists for Panama
South American Games bronze medalists for Panama
Competitors at the 2018 South American Games
Competitors at the 2022 South American Games
Competitors at the 2022 World Games
21st-century Panamanian people